Jonas Warrer (born 22 March 1979) is a Danish sailor in the 49er class who sails with Martin Kirketerp. At the 2008 Summer Olympics, they stood to win the gold medal before the final round, but their mast broke shortly before start. The Croatian team lent the Danes their boat, and the Danes went on to finish seventh in the round, which would win them the gold medal.

References

External links
 
 
 

1979 births
Living people
Danish male sailors (sport)
Sailors at the 2008 Summer Olympics – 49er
Olympic sailors of Denmark
Olympic gold medalists for Denmark
Olympic medalists in sailing
Medalists at the 2008 Summer Olympics
Extreme Sailing Series sailors
Sailors at the 2016 Summer Olympics – 49er
Sailors at the 2020 Summer Olympics – 49er
Sportspeople from Aarhus